Rabson Mucheleng'anga (born 14 September 1989) is a Zambian football goalkeeper and plays for Nchanga Rangers F.C. in the Zambian Premier League. He formerly played for Power Dynamos FC.

International career
While still young, he is a regular on the Zambian national team, second choice only to George Kolala. and is also former U-20 national player.

References

1989 births
Living people
Zambian footballers
Zambia international footballers
Association football goalkeepers
Power Dynamos F.C. players
Nchanga Rangers F.C. players